Meie Mats, named after an Estonian folk song, is a prestigious yearly humour award issued since 1987 and originally initiated by Edgar Spriit, the chief editor of Pikker, a long-time Estonian humour magazine.  The award is customarily announced on April 1, the April Fools' Day, and it can only be awarded to any person once, in recognition of his life work in the field of humour, satire and comedy.

See also 

 :Category:Recipients of Meie Mats

References 

Estonian humour
Awards established in 1987
1987 establishments in Estonia
Estonian awards